Kleistpark is a Berlin U-Bahn station on the  line. The following station is Yorckstraße (with connections to S-Bahn lines S1, S2 and S25).

References

U7 (Berlin U-Bahn) stations
Buildings and structures in Tempelhof-Schöneberg
Railway stations in Germany opened in 1971